BGI may refer to:

 Bainbridge Graduate Institute, an MBA program based in Washington State
 Bagnoles-Gaussen Index, or Gaussen Index, a climatological measure of aridity
 Barclays Global Investors, an asset management business
 Basic Ground Instructor, a class of Ground Instructor certificate issued in the United States by the Federal Aviation Administration
 BGI Genomics, a genome sequencing company in China
 Borland Graphics Interface, a graphics library included with many Borland compiler products in the 1990s
 Grantley Adams International Airport, an airport in Barbados (IATA airport code)